Calosoma bridgesi is a brachypterous species of ground beetle in the subfamily of Carabinae. It flies in January and February.

History
It was originally described by Maximilien Chaudoir in 1869. In 1927 Stephan von Breuning placed C. bridgesi into subgenus Neocalosoma, which was later accepted by Jeannel but only as a subgenus of genus Castrida. In 1963, Boris Gidaspov moved C. bridgesi to subgenus Blaptosoma of genus Callitropa. Following that move Jeannel placed the species into genus Castrida and by 1968 it was placed into subgenus Microcalosoma by Basilewsky.

References

bridgesi
Beetles described in 1869
Beetles of South America